The Derby Italiano is a Group 2 flat horse race in Italy open to three-year-old thoroughbred colts and fillies. It is run at Capannelle over a distance of 2,200 metres (about 1 mile and 3 furlongs), and it is scheduled to take place each year in May.

It is Italy's equivalent of The Derby, a famous race in England.

History
The event was established in 1884, and it was originally run in the district of Capannelle over 2,400 metres. It was initially called the Derby Reale, and most of the prize money for the inaugural running was donated by King Umberto I.

The race was transferred to its current venue in 1926. It was known as the Gran Premio del Re in the 1930s, and for a brief period it was titled the Gran Premio del Re Imperatore. It was renamed the Derby Italiano in 1946.

The present system of race grading was introduced in the early 1970s, and the Derby Italiano was initially classed at Group 1 level. It was opened to horses born and bred outside Italy in 1981.

The Derby Italiano was cut to 2,200 metres in 2008, and it was downgraded to Group 2 status in 2009. With a current prize fund of €814,000, it is the most valuable horse race in Italy.

Records
Leading jockey (8 wins):
 Federico Regoli – Gianpietrina (1917), Meissonier (1919), Ghiberti (1920), Michelangelo (1921), Melozzo da Forlì (1922), Cima da Conegliano (1923), Lui (1925), Apelle (1926)

Leading trainer (21 wins):
 Federico Tesio – Guido Reni (1911), Rembrandt (1912), Fausta (1914), Van Dyck (1915), Gianpietrina (1917), Meissonier (1919), Ghiberti (1920), Michelangelo (1921), Melozzo da Forlì (1922), Cima da Conegliano (1923), Apelle (1926), Jacopa del Sellaio (1932), Ugolino da Siena (1935), Donatello II (1937), Nearco (1938), Bellini (1940), Niccolo dell'Arca (1941), Torbido (1944), Tenerani (1947), Daumier (1951), Botticelli (1954)

Leading owner (20 wins): (includes part ownership)
 Federico Tesio – Guido Reni (1911), Rembrandt (1912), Fausta (1914), Van Dyck (1915), Gianpietrina (1917), Meissonier (1919), Ghiberti (1920), Michelangelo (1921), Melozzo da Forlì (1922), Cima da Conegliano (1923), Apelle (1926), Jacopa del Sellaio (1932), Ugolino da Siena (1935), Donatello II (1937), Nearco (1938), Bellini (1940), Niccolo dell'Arca (1941), Tenerani (1947), Daumier (1951), Botticelli (1954)

Winners since 1980

 The 2016 winner Saent was later exported to Hong Kong and renamed Super Chic.
 The 2018 winner Summer Festival was later exported to Hong Kong and renamed Party Together.
 The 2019 winner Keep On Fly was later exported to Hong Kong and renamed Generous Charity.

1998 winner, Central Park, ran 2nd in the 1999 Group 1 Melbourne Cup at 3200 metres.

Earlier winners

 1884: Andreina
 1885: Rosenberg
 1886: Enio
 1887: Carl Andrea
 1888: Filiberto
 1889: Rabicano
 1890: Doralice
 1891: Barone
 1892: Arcadia
 1893: Festuca
 1894: Sansonetto
 1895: Oranzeb
 1896: Goldoni
 1897: Hira
 1898: Simba
 1899: Elena
 1900: Cloridano
 1901: Karibo
 1902: Tocsin
 1903: Esquilino
 1904: The Oak
 1905: Onorio
 1906: Creso
 1907: Belbuc
 1908: Demetrio
 1909: Dedalo
 1910: Saturno
 1911: Guido Reni
 1912: Rembrandt
 1913: Nettuno
 1914: Fausta
 1915: Van Dyck
 1916: Kosheni
 1917: Gianpietrina
 1918: Carlone
 1919: Meissonier
 1920: Ghiberti
 1921: Michelangelo
 1922: Melozzo da Forli
 1923: Cima da Conegliano
 1924: Manistee
 1925: Lui
 1926: Apelle
 1927: Senecio
 1928: Dervio
 1929: Ortello
 1930: Emanuele Filiberto
 1931: Oberon
 1932: Jacopa del Sellaio
 1933: Pilade
 1934: Amur
 1935: Ugolino da Siena
 1936: Archidamia
 1937: Donatello
 1938: Nearco
 1939: Vezzano
 1940: Bellini
 1941: Niccolo dell'Arca
 1942: Arco
 1943: Orsenigo
 1944: Torbido
 1945: Traghetto
 1946: Gladiolo
 1947: Tenerani
 1948: Leon de San Marco
 1949: Golfo
 1950: Stigliano
 1951: Daumier
 1952: Zamoretto
 1953: Rivisondoli
 1954: Botticelli
 1955: Altrek
 1956: Barba Toni
 1957: Braque
 1958: Sedan
 1959: Rio Marin
 1960: Fils d'Eve
 1961: Lauso
 1962: Antelami
 1963: Braccio da Montone
 1964: Diacono
 1965: Varano
 1966: Appiani
 1967: Ruysdael
 1968: Hogarth
 1969: Bonconte di Montefeltro
 1970: Ortis
 1971: Ardale
 1972: Gay Lussac
 1973: Cerreto
 1974: Suffolk
 1975: Orange Bay
 1976: Red Arrow
 1977: Sirlad
 1978: Elgay
 1979: Marracci

The 1916, 1917 and 1925 runnings took place at Parioli, and the 1918, 1944 and 1945 editions were held at Milan.

See also
 List of Italian flat horse races

References

 Racing Post:

 capannelleippodromo.it – Albo d'Oro – Derby Italiano.
 galopp-sieger.de – Derby Italiano.
 horseracingintfed.com – International Federation of Horseracing Authorities – Derby Italiano (2016).
 pedigreequery.com – Derby Italiano – Roma Capannelle.
 tbheritage.com – Derby Italiano.

Flat horse races for three-year-olds
Horse races in Italy
Recurring sporting events established in 1884
1884 establishments in Italy
Sports competitions in Rome